Ivan Ljubičić defeated Peter Wessels 7–6(7–5), 4–6, 7–6(7–4) to win the 2007 Ordina Open singles event.

Seeds

Draws

Finals

Section 1

Section 2

External links
Singles draw
Qualifying draw

Singles
Ordina Open